Nurtih Aviv is a French film director and director of photography who was born 11 March 1945, in Tel Aviv (then in Mandatory Palestine).

Biography 
Nurith Aviv has directed fourteen documentary films, and the topic of language is central to her personal and cinematographic exploration.

Aviv was the first woman to be recognized as Director of Photography by the CNC, the French National Center for Cinema and Animation, and has served as cinematographer for some one hundred feature and documentary films (for directors who include Agnès Varda, Amos Gitaï, René Allio and Jacques Doillon).

In 2019, Aviv was the recipient of the Grand Prix of the Académie Française (nominated by Amin Maalouf)

In 2015, a retrospective of her oeuvre titled "Filiation, Language, Place" was held at the Centre Pompidou in Paris, including 40 films for which she served as director or cinematographer.

was the winner of the 2009 Édouard Glissant Prize.

2008, a retrospective of her films took place at the Jeu de Paume.

Screenings of her latest films were held at  Les 3 Luxembourgs Cinema, accompanied by numerous in-person and virtual discussions with writers, philosophers, psychoanalysts and literary critics.

Filmography

References

External links

Nurith Aviv's web page

1945 births
Living people
Israeli emigrants to France
20th-century French Jews
People from Tel Aviv
Israeli women cinematographers
French women cinematographers
Israeli women film directors
French women film directors